Dell Seton Medical Center at The University of Texas is a hospital on the property of the Dell Medical School in Austin, Texas. It is the teaching hospital for the medical school.

It is on land owned by the University of Texas at Austin. Central Health leases the land, and in turn the owner and operator of the hospital building, Seton Healthcare Family, subleases it from Central Health.

History
The Michael & Susan Dell Foundation donated $25 million to the hospital in 2016.

It opened on May 21, 2017, replacing Brackenridge Hospital.

References

External links
 Dell Seton Medical Center at The University of Texas

Hospitals in Austin, Texas
Level 1 trauma centers
Hospitals established in 2017
2017 establishments in Texas